The 1981 Scottish Professional Championship was a professional non-ranking snooker tournament, which took place in March 1981 in Kildrum, Scotland.

Ian Black won the title by beating Matt Gibson 11–7 in the final.

Main draw

References

Scottish Professional Championship
Scottish Professional Championship
Scottish Professional Championship
Scottish Professional Championship
Sport in North Lanarkshire